The 2009 Golden League is the 12th edition of the IAAF's annual series of six athletics meets, held across Europe, with athletes having the chance to win the Golden League Jackpot of $1 million.

Programme

Results

Men

Women

References
 Official website

Golden League
IAAF Golden League